Gilbert Innes Strachan, CBE (August 1888 - 9 December 1963) was a prominent British researcher and professor of medicine.

Early life and education
Born in Bristol to James and  Agnes ( Todd) Strachan, he graduated from the University of Glasgow with an M.B., Ch.B. in 1910, followed by his doctorate in 1913. Strachan then worked in the London Hospital before serving in the First World War as a captain in the Royal Army Medical Corps. 

Post-war, Strachan moved to Cardiff in 1919 to study abortions whilst working as an assistant pathologist. He was present and involved in the establishment of Cardiff's clinical school, working as an assistant to Sir Ewen Maclean at this time.

Career in medicine
In 1932, the Welsh National School of Medicine promoted Strachan to Professor of Obstetrics and Gynaecology. As part of this role, Strachan was said to be an inspiring lecturer. He retained his post until his retirement in 1953, though he also owned a private practice and worked in research. His most notable research includes his influence in the advancement of radium treatment for cancer of the womb, documented in his published works on the subject, namely in his Textbook of Obstetrics (1947). He was thus in demand as an examiner in his area of expertise, working for the universities of Birmingham, Bristol, Oxford and Wales. He also travelled to Australia in 1950 where he lectured and examined students in Sydney and Melbourne, representing the Royal College of Obstetrics and Gynaecology. Strachan was a founding member of this institution and, in 1952-55, vice-president. In 1953, he received the CBE.

Personal life

Strachan developed a collection of Spode porcelain and china, which he donated to the National Museum of Wales. 

In 1920, he married Olive Andrews, daughter of F.E. Andrews, with whom he had a son. He died in his home at 29 Cathedral Road, Cardiff, on 9 December 1963, aged 75.

References 
 The Times, 14 Dec. 1963;
 Profile, Biography.wales. Accessed 16 December 2022. 

Welsh scientists
1888 births
1963 deaths
20th-century Welsh scientists
20th-century Welsh educators
Commanders of the Order of the British Empire